Korra is a village in the Dumbriguda tehsil, Alluri Sitharama Raju district, Andhra Pradesh state, India.  Its PIN is 531151.

References

Villages in Alluri Sitharama Raju district